Sirka is a village of Chhachh Valley, in Tehsil Hazro of  Attock District, Punjab, Pakistan.

Demographics
The majority population of Sirka village are from Pashtun origin, who speak Pushto language, which is the nationalized language in Afghanistan. Most of the population belongs to the Barakzai tribe from Afghanistan.

Geography
The village was geographically situated in the Attock District within one mile of the south side of the Indus River.
Sirka neighbours the villages of Waisa in the South East, Tajak on the South side, Shadi Khan in the South east, and River Indus towards the North. The capital city of Pakistan, Islamabad, is located 60 miles east of Sirka.

References

Villages in Attock District